Rabah Labiod (born 26 March 1948 in Constantine) is a former Algerian boxer. He competed at the 1968 Summer Olympic Games in the welterweight event, during which he lost in the first round.

1968 Olympic results
Below is the record of Rabah Labiod, an Algerian welterweight boxer who competed at the 1968 Mexico City Olympics:

 Round of 64: lost to Julius Luipa (Zambia) by decision, 1-4

References

Algerian male boxers
Boxers at the 1968 Summer Olympics
Olympic boxers of Algeria
1948 births
Living people
Sportspeople from Constantine, Algeria
Welterweight boxers
21st-century Algerian people